Demolition Man may refer to:

 "Demolition Man" (song), a song released in two 1981 versions, by Grace Jones and by The Police, and later in 1993 as the title track for the film Demolition Man
 Demolition Man (film), a 1993 film starring Sylvester Stallone and Wesley Snipes
 Demolition Man (soundtrack), a 1993 soundtrack album from the film, by Elliot Goldenthal
 Demolition Man (album), an EP by Sting released in conjunction with the 1993 film
 Demolition Man (pinball), a pinball machine by Williams based on the film
 Demolition Man (video game), a 1994 video game based on the film
 Demolition Man (comics), a fictional character in the Marvel Comics universe
 Demolition Man (TV series), an Australian reality television series
 "Demolition Man", a song by Def Leppard from Euphoria

Nicknames 
 Tony Dolan (born 1964), English musician
 Azahari Husin (1957–2005), Malaysian terrorist bombmaker
 Alistair Overeem (born 1980), Dutch mixed martial artist
 Darren Webster (born 1968), English darts player

See also 
The Demolished Man, a 1953 science-fiction novel by Alfred Bester
 "Demoman", a playable class in the Team Fortress video games